The 1988 Roller Hockey World Cup was the twenty-eighth roller hockey world cup, organized by the Fédération Internationale de Roller Sports. It was contested by 10 national teams (5 from Europe, 2 from South America, 2 from Africa and 1 from North America). All the games were played in the city of A Coruña, in Spain, the chosen city to host the World Cup.

Results

Standings

See also
 FIRS Roller Hockey World Cup

External links
 1988 World Cup in rink-hockey.net historical database

Roller Hockey World Cup
International roller hockey competitions hosted by Spain
1988 in roller hockey
1988 in Spanish sport